Kyle Alexander Fraser-Allen (born 12 February 1990) is an English football player, who plays for Hayes and Yeading.

Career
Fraser-Allen was a member of the Tottenham Hotspur youth academy, participated in the majority of the 2007-08 academy season. On 25 February 2009, Fraser-Allen joined Macclesfield Town on loan and later made his professional debut by appearing as a 76th-minute substitute against Port Vale. He returned to Tottenham at the end of March.

On 1 June 2009, Fraser-Allen was released from his Tottenham Hotspur contract.

On 27 September 2009, he signed with Conference National side Hayes and Yeading.

He also used to play for Nike Academy.

Personal life
Fraser-Allen attended Wanstead High School, London.

References

External links

Kyle Fraser-Allen player profile at Hayes & Yeading United F.C. Official Website

1990 births
Living people
Association football midfielders
English footballers
Tottenham Hotspur F.C. players
Macclesfield Town F.C. players
Hayes & Yeading United F.C. players
English Football League players
People from Wanstead